Hampton is an unincorporated community in Upshur County, West Virginia, United States.

A variant name was Ivanhoe; the present name is in honor of Hampton Fisher. A post office called Ivanhoe was established in 1891, and remained in operation until 1976.

References 

Unincorporated communities in West Virginia
Unincorporated communities in Upshur County, West Virginia